Maheem commonly pronounced as Mahem ( महेम् ) is a village in Nakodar.  Nakodar is a tehsil in the city Jalandhar of Indian state of Punjab.

References

Villages in Jalandhar district
Villages in Nakodar tehsil